Phonophilus is a genus of spiders in the family Lycosidae. It was first described in 1831 by Ehrenberg. , it contains only one species, Phonophilus portentosus, found in North Africa (in Libya).

References

Lycosidae
Monotypic Araneomorphae genera
Spiders of Africa